The eighth season of Will & Grace premiered with a live episode on September 29, 2005 and concluded on May 18, 2006, consisting of 24 episodes. The eighth season was the final season of the series' original run; the ninth season and series revival premiered on September 28, 2017.

Cast and characters

Main cast 
 Eric McCormack as Will Truman
 Debra Messing as Grace Adler
 Megan Mullally as Karen Walker
 Sean Hayes as Jack McFarland
 Shelley Morrison as Rosario Salazar

Recurring cast 
 Harry Connick Jr. as Dr. Marvin "Leo" Markus
 Bobby Cannavale as Vince D'Angelo
 Leslie Jordan as Beverley Leslie
 Michael Angarano as Elliot
 Leigh-Allyn Baker as Ellen
 Tom Gallop as Rob
 Tim Bagley as Larry
 Jerry Levine as Joe

Special guest stars 
 Alec Baldwin as Malcolm Widmark
 Andy Richter as Dale
 Richard Chamberlain as Clyde
 Jason Biggs as Baby Glenn
 Debbie Reynolds as Bobbi Adler
 Blythe Danner as Marilyn Truman
 Steven Weber as Sam Truman
 Matt Lauer as himself
 Lily Tomlin as Margot
 Taye Diggs as James Hanson
 Daryl Hall as himself
 John Oates as himself
 Shohreh Aghdashloo as Pam
 Britney Spears as Amber-Louise
 George Takei as himself
 Wanda Sykes as Cricket
 Eileen Brennan as Zandra
 Sydney Pollack as George Truman
 Lesley Ann Warren as Tina
 Bernadette Peters as Gin
 Josh Lucas as himself
 Kevin Bacon as himself

Guest stars 
 Millicent Martin as Leni
 Jim Rash as Brent
 Traci Lords as Rose
 Reed Alexander as Jordan Truman
 Jennette McCurdy as Girl in Cinema
 Robert Michael Morris as Tommy
 Shawn Christian as Travis
 Kyle Bornheimer as Waiter
 John Ducey as Jamie
 Laura Kightlinger as Nurse Sheila
 Paris Barclay as Director
 Christina Moore as Kitty
 Jere Burns as Man in Cast
 Maria Thayer as Lila

Episodes

References 

8
2005 American television seasons
2006 American television seasons
Television episodes directed by James Burrows